Živa Dvoršak (born 9 July 1991) is a Slovenian sports shooter. She competed in the Women's 10 metre air rifle and women's 50 metre rifle three positions events at the 2012 and 2016 Summer Olympics.  She won a bronze at the 2013 European 10 metre events Championships in the 10 metre air rifle.

She studied at the University of Ljubljana from 2010 to 2013, and later studied at West Virginia University, studying mathematics.

References

1991 births
Living people
Slovenian female sport shooters
Olympic shooters of Slovenia
Shooters at the 2012 Summer Olympics
Shooters at the 2016 Summer Olympics
Shooters at the 2020 Summer Olympics
Sportspeople from Ljubljana
European Games competitors for Slovenia
Shooters at the 2015 European Games
Mediterranean Games bronze medalists for Slovenia
Mediterranean Games medalists in shooting
Competitors at the 2018 Mediterranean Games
Shooters at the 2019 European Games
21st-century Slovenian women